Flynn Hill is a prick summit in Wayne County in the U.S. state of Missouri. The peak is juat west of Missouri Route B about three miles southeast of Greenville. Wappapello Lake on the St. Francis River lies about one-half mile to the southwest.

Flynn Hill has the name of the local Flynn family.

References

Landforms of Wayne County, Missouri
Hills of Missouri